The 1987 UEFA European Under-16 Championship was the fifth edition of UEFA's European Under-16 Football Championship. France hosted the championship, during 25 May and 3 June 1987. 16 teams entered the competition. Although Italy won the final match against the Soviet Union, UEFA withdrew Italy's title, because they had played Roberto Secci, inscribed with an irregular document. No European title was awarded. The top three countries qualified for the 1987 FIFA U-16 World Championship in Canada.

Qualifying

Participants

Results

First stage

Group A

Group B

Group C

Group D

Semi-finals

Third place match

Final

Teams qualified for 1987 FIFA U-16 World Championship

References

External links
RSSSF.com

 
1987
UEFA
1987 in French sport
1987
UEFA European Under 16
UEFA European Under 16
1987 in youth association football